Architectural terracotta refers to a fired mixture of clay and water that can be used in a non-structural, semi-structural, or structural capacity on the exterior or interior of a building. Terracotta pottery, as earthenware is called when not used for vessels, is an ancient building material that translates from Latin as "baked earth".  Some architectural terracotta is actually the stronger stoneware.  It can be unglazed, painted, slip glazed, or glazed. A piece of terracotta is composed of a hollow clay web enclosing a void space or cell. The cell can be installed in compression with mortar or hung with metal anchors. All cells are partially backfilled with mortar.

By the late 19th century the version with a ceramic glaze, namely glazed architectural terracotta became more popular.  Terracotta can be used together with brick, for ornamental areas; if the source of the clay is the same they can be made to harmonize, or if different to contrast. It is also often a cladding over a different structural material.

Chemistry 
Terracotta is made of a clay or silt matrix, a fluxing agent, and grog or bits of previously fired clay. Clays are the remnants of weathered rocks that are smaller than 2 microns. They are composed of silica and alumina. Kaolinite, halloysite, montmorillonite, illite and mica are all good types of clays for ceramic production. When mixed with water they create hydrous aluminum silica that is plastic and moldable. During the firing process the clays lose their water and become a hardened ceramic body.

Fluxes add oxygen when they burn to create more uniform melting of the silica particles throughout the body of the ceramic. This increases the strength of the material. Common fluxing materials are calcium carbonate, alkaline feldspars, manganese, and iron oxides. Grog is used to prevent shrinking and provide structure for the fine clay matrix.

History 
Terracotta was made by the ancient Greeks, Babylonians, ancient Egyptians, Romans, Chinese, and the Indus River Valley and Native American cultures. It was used for roof tiles, medallions, statues, capitals and other small architectural details.

Ancient Eastern terracotta 

Indian terracotta manufacturers hand pressed, poured, and double-molded the clay mix. Plaster casts have been found in several ancient sites in Afghanistan, Bangladesh, India and Pakistan. Similarities in motifs and manufacturing processes have caused scholars to note cross cultural pollination between the Hellenic and Indus River Valley sculptural terracotta traditions. Famous early examples include the Bhitargaon temple and the Jain temple in the Mahbubnagar district.

Chinese, Korean, and Japanese terracotta making traditions were focused on non-architectural uses such as statuary or cookware but various forms of terracotta tiles were popular roofing materials.

Western terracotta

Antiquity–1700s 
Greeks used terracotta for capitals, friezes, and other elements of their temples like at Olympia or Selenius. Domestically they used it for statuary and roof tiles. The Etruscans used terracotta for roof tiles, encased beams, and enclosed brick walls with it. The Roman terracotta innovation was the underfloor or hypocaust heating system that they used for their bath houses. Medieval European architecture did not expand terracotta use beyond the ancients. The manufacture of tile roofs diminished with low cost thatch roofing widely available. Southern German, Italian and Spanish city states kept the tradition alive.

1700s–1880s 

England
Englishmen Richard Holt and Thomas Ripley patented an artificial stone recipe in 1722. The business was fairly successful at making small architectural ornaments. Their company was taken over by George and Eleanor Coade in 1769. [See Coade stone, See Eleanor Coade ] George died a year later, leaving the company to his wife and daughter, both named Eleanor Coade. The Coade ladies popularized the grey mix of terracotta as an alternative to stone with the help of architects like Horace Walpole and Sir John Soane. Georgian architectural style was in vogue and demand for repetitive, classically inspired décor was very fashionable. The Victoria and Albert Museum (1867–1880) and the Natural History Museum of London (1879–1880) buildings ushered in an era of mass-produced architectural terracotta.

United States
Most early terracotta was shipped from Europe or made by small local ceramicists. The first manufacturer of architectural terracotta was opened by Henry Tolman Jr. in Worcester, MA around 1849. The capitals in the Massachusetts State Capitol in Worcester are early examples of locally produced terracotta. In the 1850s, New York architects like Richard Upjohn and James Renwick began to use it as an economical replacement for stone.

1880s–1930s 
Reactions to the Chicago fire in 1871 spurred interest in terracotta as a fireproof building material. In the age of skyscraper construction, the cast iron frame needed to be protected. Terracotta was a lightweight, moldable, fire and pollution resistant material that could be mass-produced. Architects such as Burnham and Root, H.H. Richardson, Louis Sullivan, and McKim, Mead & White became interested in using terracotta as a building material rather than just as imitation stone.

Issues with installation, water penetration, and corroding interior metal caused the industry to organize the National Terracotta Society. They published two widely used standards, in 1914 and 1924, that detailed construction methods, anchoring systems, waterproofing, and maintenance standards.

1930s–present 
Economic interest in terracotta plummeted in the 1930s but the industry did not die out. Terracotta could not compete with newer mass-produced materials such as plate glass, new metal alloys, and cement block construction. Changing fashions towards more minimalist, modern styles such as the Bauhaus School and International Style did not help the waning industry.

Post-World War II the industry had to face the decline of buildings built during the heyday of the material, 1910–1940. Structural problems resulting from incomplete waterproofing, improper installation, poor maintenance, and interior corroding mild steel made the material unpopular in newer constructions.

To combat this accusation against quality, several other industry publications were produced between 1945 and the 1960s. They did not succeed in reviving the artistic architectural terracotta but they were able to turn their attention to public buildings. Advances in machine extruded terracotta made it competitive with other hollow clay tile alternatives at the time. In tiles form, terracotta had a renewal as a hallmark of mid-century public buildings.

It lost steam in the 1960s with the introduction of more synthetic materials on the mass market. The industry was sustained by the need for replacement blocks for old buildings, hollow clay tile, and now rainscreen.

Manufacturing process 

Terracotta can be made by pouring or pressing the mix into a plaster or sandstone mold, clay can be hand carved, or mix can be extruded into a mold using specialized machines. Clay shrinks as it dries from water loss therefore all molds are made slightly larger than the required dimensions. After the desired green-ware, or air dried, shape is created it is fired in a kiln for several days where it shrinks even further. The hot clay is slowly cooled then hand finished. The ceramics are shipped to the project site where they are installed by local contractors. The hollow pieces are partially backfilled with mortar then placed into the wall, suspended from metal anchors, or hung on metal shelf angles.

Design 
Academically trained artists were often the designers of the terracotta forms. Their drawings would be interpreted by the manufacturer who would plan out the joint locations and anchoring system. Once finalized, the drawings were turned into a plaster reality by sculptors who would create the mold for the craftsmen.

Clay preparation 
Clay selection was very important to manufacture of terracotta. Homogenous, finer grain sizes were preferred. The color of the clay body was determined by the types of deposits that were locally available to the manufacture. Sand was added to temper the process. Crushed ceramic scraps called grog were also added to stiffen the product and help reduce shrinkage.

Weathering the clay allowed pyrites to chemically change to hydrated ferric oxide and reduced alkali content. This aging minimizes the potential chemical changes during the rest of the manufacturing process. The weathered raw clay was dried, ground, and screened. Later, it would have been pugged in a mill that would mix the clay with water using rotating blades and force the blend through a sieve.

Hand pressing terracotta 
An artist makes a negative plaster mold based on a clay positive prototype. 1–1¼" of the clay/water mixture is pressed into the mold. Wire mesh or other stiffeners are added to create the web, or clay body that surrounds the hollow cell. The product is air dried to allow the plaster to suck the moisture out of the green clay product. It is fired then slowly cooled.

Extrusion 
Mechanized extrusion was used for the mass-production of terracotta blocks, popular in the 1920s. Prepared clay was fed into a machine that would then push the mix through a mold. The technique required the blocks to be made with simple shapes, so this process was often used for flooring, roofing, cladding, and later hollow clay tiles.

Glazing 
The last step before firing the greenware was glazing. True glazes are made from various salts but prior to the 1890s most blocks were slip glazed or coated with a watered-down version of the clay mix. Liquefying the clay increased the amount of small silica particles that would be deposited on the surface of the block. These would melt during firing and harden. By 1900 almost all colors could be achieved with the addition of salt glazes. Black or brown were made by adding manganese oxide.

Firing 

The kiln firing process could take days, up to two weeks. The clay is heated slowly to around 500°C to sweat off the loose or macroscopic water between the molecules. Then the temperature is increased to close to 900°C to release the chemically bonded water in gaseous form and the clay particles will begin to melt together or sinter. If the kiln reaches 1000°C then the clay particles will vitrtify and become glass like. After the maximum temperature was reached then the clay was slowly cooled over a few days. During firing a fireskin is created. A fireskin is the glass-like "bread crust" that covers the biscuit or interior body.

Various kilns were used as technology developed and capital was available for investment. Muffle kilns were the most common kiln. They were used as early as 1870. The kilns burned gas, coal, or oil that heated an interior chamber from an exterior chamber. The walls "muffled" the heat so the greenware was not directly exposed to the flames.

Down-draught kilns were also widely used. The interior chamber radiated heat around the terracotta by pulling in hot air from behind an exterior cavity wall. Like the muffle wall, the cavity wall protected the greenware from burning.

Installation 
The earliest terracotta elements were laid directly into the masonry but as structural metal became more popular terracotta was suspended by metal anchors. The development of cast and later wrought iron as a structural material was closely linked to the rise of terracotta. Cast iron was first used as columns in the 1820s by William Strickland. Over the course of the 19th century metal became more incorporated into construction but it was not widely used structurally until the late 1890s.

A series of disastrous fires (Chicago, 1871; Boston, 1872; and San Francisco, 1906) earned terracotta a reputation for being a fireproof, lightweight cladding material that could protect metal from melting. Holes were bored in the hollow blocks in choice locations to allow for metal 'J' or 'Z' hooks to connect the blocks to the load bearing steel frame and/or masonry walls. The metal could be hung vertically or anchored horizontally. Pins, clamps, clips, plates, and a variety of other devices were used to help secure the blocks. The joints would then be mortared and the block would be partially backfilled.

Degradation 
The most common reasons for terracotta to fail are: poor manufacturing, improper installation, weathering, freeze/thaw cycling, and salt formation from atmospheric pollution. The porosity of terracotta greatly impacts its performance. The ability or inability for water and pollutants to enter into the material is directly correlated to its structural capacity. Terracotta is very strong in compression but weak in tension and shear strength. Any anomalous material expanding (ice, salts, incompatible fill material, or corroding metal anchors which cause rust jacking) inside the clay body will cause it to crack and eventually spall.

Inherent faults can severely impact the performance of the material. Improper molding can cause air pockets to form that increase the rate of deterioration. If the block is not fired or cooled properly then the fireskin will not be uniformly adhered to the substrate and can flake off. Likewise, if a glaze is not fired properly it will crack, flake, and fall off. Discolorations can result from mineral impurities such as pyrites or barium carbonates.
 
A fair amount of damage comes from clumsy transportation, storage, or installation of the material. If the mortar used around and inside the blocks is too strong then the stress will be translated to the terracotta block which will fail over time. Corroding interior metal anchors expand at a faster rate than the surrounding ceramic body causing it to fail from the inside out. Improper loading of the hollow terracotta blocks can create stress cracks.

Imperfect repair work often exacerbates the underlying problems, speeding up the decay of surrounding elements as well. Making penetrations in terracotta units to attach objects to the outside walls also allows moisture to enter the system, and often crack the terracotta as well. Installing sealant rather than mortar, or applying impervious coating, will trap moisture within the terracotta.

The environment also plays a large role in the survival of terracotta. Different types of air pollution can cause different types of surface problems. When it rains, water and salts get sucked into the voids in and around the terracotta through capillary action. If it freezes then ice forms, putting internal stress on the material, causing it to crack from inside. A similar problem happens with atmospheric pollutants that are carried into the gaps by rains water. The pollution creates a mildly acidic solution that eats at the clay body or a salt crust forms, causing similar issues as ice.

With the majority of terracotta buildings being over one-hundred years old, failing terracotta has become a problem in many cities such as New York. Regular inspections and maintenance and repair programs are required by law, but nonetheless well-publicized incidents such as the death of Erica Tishman after a piece of terracotta fell from a 105-year old building.

See also

Manufacturers
 John Marriott Blashfield
 Burmantofts Pottery
 Fambrini & Daniels, Lincoln
 Royal Doulton, UK
 Gibbs and Canning, UK
 Gladding, McBean, California, USA
 Perth Amboy Terra Cotta Company of Perth Amboy, New Jersey, USA

References

Bibliography
Barr, Emily. "PRESSING ISSUES IN-KIND TERRA COTTA REPLACEMENT IN THE 21ST CENTURY." Masters of Science Thesis. Columbia University. 2014
Dillon M. (1985) Bricks, Tiles and Terracotta, An Exhibition on one of the major industries of the Wrexham area, (Held  at the Grosvenor Museum, Chester), 24pp.
Didden, Amanda. "Standardization of terracotta anchorage: an analysis of shop drawings from the Northwestern Terra Cotta Company and the O.W. Ketcham Terra Cotta Works." Masters Thesis, University of Pennsylvania, 2003.
Fidler, John. The Conservation of Architectural Terracotta and Faience. Transactions of the Association for Studies in the Conservation of Historic Buildings, no. 6(1981):3-16.
Fidler, John. Fragile Remains. Architectural Ceramics: their History, Manufacture and Conservation. London: James and James, 1996.

Gerns, Edward and Joshua Freedland. "Understanding terra-cotta distress: Evaluation and repair approaches." Journal of Building Appraisal. October 2006.
James W P Campbell & Will Pryce, (2003) Brick: A World History, 
Jenkins, Moses. "Terracotta and Faience." Historic Scotland, Longmore House.
Mack, Robert C. "The Manufacture and Use of Architectural Terra Cotta in the United States." In The Technology of Historic American Buildings, edited by H. Ward Jandl, 117–51. Washington, D.C.: Foundation for Preservation Technology, 1983.

Ries, Heinrich and Henry Leighton. History of the Clay Working Industry in the United States.  New York: John Wiley, 1909.

Stratton, M. (1993) The Terracotta Revival : Building Innovation and the Image of the Industrial City in Britain and North America. London : Gollancz.
Taylor, James. Terra Cotta. Architectural Record, Vol. 1(July 1891-July 1892):63-68.
Taylor, James. "History of Terra Cotta in New York City." Architectural Record 2 July 1892-July 1893:136-148.

Wells, Jeremy C. History of Structural Hollow Clay Tile in the United States
Construction History, Vol. 22 (2007):27-46.

External links
 Article on terracotta in Victorian and Edwardian Terracotta Buildings
 Understanding and Conserving Terracotta - Dr Michael Stratton
 Bolton Museums

Soil-based building materials
Building
Terracotta